A total of 67 players represented the East Pakistan cricket team in first-class matches between the team's debut in November 1954 and its final completed match in September 1969. Representing East Pakistan (East Bengal prior to 1955), a former provincial state of the Islamic Republic of Pakistan, the team can be considered a direct predecessor to the present national cricket team of Bangladesh, which declared independence in 1971. Prior to the partition of India in August 1947, cricketers from the region that is now Bangladesh generally played for Bengal, which had been active in Ranji Trophy matches since the 1935–36 season.

Most of the team's matches at first-class level came in the domestic Quaid-e-Azam Trophy, while others were played in the Ayub Trophy or against touring international sides. The team first played in the Quaid-e-Azam Trophy during the 1954–55 season, but did not appear again until the 1959–60 season, subsequently going on to field a team for seven consecutive tournaments (incorporating the 1961–62 to 1970–71 seasons). For other tournaments the province was split into several sides, including East Pakistan "A" and "B" and the East Pakistan Greens and Whites. Several other sides primarily fielding East Pakistani players also participated in Pakistani domestic competitions. In total, East Pakistan played 20 matches at first-class level, although two of these were abandoned without a ball being bowled.

As regional Pakistani cricket teams were almost exclusively amateur at the time, the composition of the team was often highly unstable. Of the 67 players for East Pakistan, 26 played only a single match for the team, while only two played more than ten matches—Abdul Latif, the team's highest-scoring batsman, played fifteen matches, captaining the side in ten, and Daulat Zaman played eleven. East Pakistan often fielded high-quality players from West Pakistan who had re-located to the province for employment or business commitments. These included six Test cricketers—Mahmood Hussain, Mohammad Munaf, Mufassir-ul-Haq, Nasim-ul-Ghani, Naushad Ali, and Niaz Ahmed No native East Pakistanis, Bengali or otherwise, represented Pakistan's national side at Test level. The closest was Raqibul Hasan, who was twelfth man against the touring New Zealanders during the 1969–70 season, and the following season represented a full-strength Pakistan side against a Commonwealth XI. Raqibul went on to serve as Bangladesh's inaugural captain in the 1979 ICC Trophy, and later played two One Day International (ODI) matches for the team. Two other East Pakistan players went on to play for Bangladesh in ICC Trophy matches—Ashraful Haque and Shafiqul Haque.

Key

List of players

List of captains

References

 
East Pakistan, first-class
Lists of Pakistani cricketers